Herce is a town and municipality in La Rioja province in northern Spain.

References

External links

Ayuntamiento de Herce

Municipalities in La Rioja (Spain)